Man You Love to Hate – Live is a live album by the Irish-English alternative rock band My Bloody Valentine. It was released in 1985 on Schuldige Scheitel Productions. The album was recorded on 9 March 1985 at Sputnik-Kino in West Berlin, Germany, as part of the Amigo Records Die Kwahl music festival, and later mixed at Sulo-Studios. The record date is incorrectly credited as "9.2.85" on the cover. The album features the band's original line-up, material from their debut mini album This Is Your Bloody Valentine (1985) and four unreleased songs ("Scavengers", "The Devil Made Me Do It", "The Man You Love to Hate", and "A Town Called Bastard") never known to have been recorded in-studio.

Only a few hundred cassette copies of Man You Love to Hate – Live were pressed and some copies included a plastic sleeve cover with several inlays and promotional inserts. The album went out of print prior to My Bloody Valentine's underground success with their two original studio albums, Isn't Anything (1988) and Loveless (1991). Parergon Records were due to re-release a remastered version of the album on CD in 2003, however, it was not released until 2007.

Track listing

Personnel
My Bloody Valentine
David Conway – vocals
Kevin Shields – guitar, bass guitar, backing vocals
Colm Ó Cíosóig – drums, percussion
Tina Durkin – keyboards

References

External links

1985 live albums
My Bloody Valentine (band) live albums